Basil Germaine Wong (born 11 March 1986) is a Sint Maartener footballer who plays as a midfielder for Flames United.

International career
On 25 July 2018, Wong made his debut for Sint Maarten in a friendly against the British Virgin Islands. He made his competitive debut on 12 October 2018 in a Nations League qualifying match against Bermuda.

References

External links

1986 births
Living people
Association football midfielders
Sint Maarten footballers
Jamaican footballers
People from Clarendon Parish, Jamaica
Jamaican people of Chinese descent
Sint Maarten international footballers